The debut season of The Ultimate Fighter (later designated The Ultimate Fighter 1) premiered on January 17, 2005.  Sixteen mixed martial arts fighters (eight light heavyweights weighing from 186 to 205 lb and eight middleweights weighing from 171 to 185 lb) were invited to participate in the show where they resided together and trained in two separate teams coached by UFC light heavyweight fighters Chuck Liddell and Randy Couture. The teams competed in physical challenges, segments hosted by singer Willa Ford, to determine which had the right to pair one of their fighters against an opponent of their choice in the same weight class, with the loser being eliminated.

The finale was broadcast live on April 9, 2005, where the two finalists in each weight class faced off for a contract with the UFC.  It was the first live UFC broadcast on non-pay-per-view television, and it drew a very impressive 1.9 overall rating.  The series was also broadcast in the UK in the spring of 2005 on Bravo. A 5-disc DVD set of "The Ultimate Fighter" was released on November 1, 2005.

Cast

Coaches
 Chuck Liddell, head coach of blue team
 Randy Couture, head coach of green team
Marc Laimon, grappling coach
Ganyao Fairtex, Muay Thai coach
Peter Welch, boxing coach

Fighters
Listed as originally assigned.

Light heavyweights
Team Liddell: Bobby Southworth, Sam Hoger, Forrest Griffin, Alex Schoenauer
Team Couture: Stephan Bonnar,  Mike Swick,  Lodune Sincaid, Jason Thacker
Middleweights
Team Liddell: Josh Koscheck, Diego Sanchez, Kenny Florian, Josh Rafferty
Team Couture: Nathan Quarry, Chris Leben, Alex Karalexis, Chris Sanford

Others
Hosts: Dana White, Willa Ford
Narrator: Mike Rowe

Episodes
Episode 1: "The Quest Begins" (original airdate: 17 January 2005)
The 16 fighters are driven to the UFC Training Center in Las Vegas, Nevada, where they meet Willa Ford, Dana White, and the coaches, Randy Couture and Chuck Liddell.
At the house, Chris Leben keeps on drinking heavily, and starts to make fun of Jason Thacker, and give people nicknames.
At 2:00 am, while Thacker is in the shower, Leben decides to urinate on his teammate's pillow, without him noticing.
The fighters are woken up at 5:00 am by Couture and Liddell, and the first day of training proves too much for almost half of the fighters.
During the jiu jitsu training, Nate Quarry cuts himself on his chin after landing a takedown.
After the second day of training, Thacker talks to Couture and says that the training is too much for him, but Couture talks him into staying and trying to get the training done.
On the 4th day, everyone is ready to spar, except for Thacker, because of the training, so Bobby Southworth and Lodune Sincaid decide to talk him into going with them, saying they need him and he is part of the team.
While Forrest Griffin and Stephan Bonnar are sparring, Griffin accidentally headbutts Bonnar, causing a need for stitches.
Light heavyweight and middleweight teams are chosen by coaches Liddell and Couture:

Episode 2: "Team Challenges" (original airdate: 24 January 2005)
Diego Sanchez and Stephen Bonnar argue over asparagus, because Sanchez ate the asparagus heads and left the stalks in the fridge.
Team Liddell wins the first light heavyweight challenge.
Later that night, Lodune Sincaid is making jokes about being homosexual, like dressing in dresses.
Jason Thacker is sent home by Couture.
Chris Leben and Sincaid continue to drink and starts to offend people. Later, a drunk Leben decides to hop the wall and find a pay phone to call someone, not mentioned.
The next morning at practice, Couture finds out about the incident, and Leben and Sincaid apologize for their actions.
Team Liddell wins the first middleweight Challenge.
Chris Sanford is sent home by Couture.

Episode 3: "Making Weight" (original airdate: 31 January 2005)
Alex Schoenauer wins the light heavyweight challenge. Bobby Southworth comes in last and will be forced to fight in the elimination bout.
Team Liddell chooses Southworth to fight Lodune Sincaid.
Southworth has to cut 20 lb. in 24 hours, with the help of Josh Koscheck and Liddell, but he comes in at 208 lb, so the Nevada State Athletic Commission gives Southworth 2 hours to cut 2 pounds, and he successfully makes it to 206 lb.
Southworth describes the weight cut as "pure hell."
Bobby Southworth defeated Lodune Sincaid by KO (strikes) at 0:12 of the second round.

Episode 4: "On The Ropes" (original airdate: 7 February 2005)
Alex Schoenauer is traded to Team Couture as part of a team reshuffle.
Team Liddell wins the middleweight challenge and the opportunity to schedule the next fight.
The blue team chooses Sanchez to fight Karalexis.
Diego Sanchez defeated Alex Karalexis by submission (rear naked choke) at 1:47 of the first round.

Episode 5: "Un-Caged" (original airdate: 14 February 2005)
Nate Quarry injures his ankle after Couture lands on his ankle during a takedown in practice.
White decides to allow the fighters to have a night out at the Hard Rock Cafe, and had a few drinks, and some of them get drunk.
At 2:00 am, the fighters are drunk and continuing to drink, and Josh Rafferty says that there is no more alcohol in the house.
By the pool, Chris Leben says something that angers Bobby Southworth, and then Southworth calls Leben a "fatherless bastard," which hurts Leben's feelings. Five minutes later, Southworth apologizes to Leben, but seems insincere.
Leben decides to sleep outside to stay away from the other fighters.
At 3:30 am, Josh Koscheck and Southworth continue to drink and then decide to pull a prank on Leben, by spraying water on the Team Couture member while he is sleeping. This wakes Leben, and causes him to go on a rampage by punching the front door window with his left hand, which cuts his knuckle skin off. Leben then punches Forrest Griffin's door in half, and Griffin later comments that there are pieces of the bedroom door in his bed.
The next day, White tells Couture and Liddell what happened the previous night between Southworth, Koscheck, and Leben. The fighters are then brought in to explain what happened.
White decides that the only fair way to resolve the situation is for Koscheck and Leben to fight.

Episode 6: "The Fight Is On" (original airdate: 21 February 2005)
As fallout from the previous episode, there is no challenge and White schedules the middleweight fight between Leben and Koscheck.
Josh Koscheck defeated Chris Leben by unanimous decision after two rounds.

Episode 7: "Ground And Pound" (original airdate: 28 February 2005)
Josh Rafferty is traded to Team Couture in another team reshuffle.
Team Couture wins the light heavyweight challenge.
Stephan Bonnar defeated Bobby Southworth by split decision after 2 rounds.

Episode 8: "Sprawl N Brawl" (original airdate: 7 March 2005)
After his fight with Stephen Bonnar, Bobby Southworth and White have a shouting match about Southworth's attitude and disrespectfulness.
Nate Quarry is eliminated from the show due to his ankle injury. White asks Quarry to stay on as an assistant coach, and he agrees.
Quarry gets to choose his replacement from the loser's lounge, and he chooses Chris Leben.
Team Couture wins the middleweight challenge.
Diego Sanchez defeated Josh Rafferty by submission (rear naked choke) at 1:48 of the first round.

Episode 9: "Low Blow" (original airdate: 14 March 2005)
Kenny Florian is traded to Team Couture in another team reshuffle.
Team Liddell wins the light heavyweight challenge.
Sam Hoger is accused of stealing from the other competitors.
Forrest Griffin defeated Alex Schoenauer by submission (strikes) at 1:20 of the first round.
During his fight with Schoenauer, Griffin receives a cut above his left eye that doctors think is possibly severe enough to prevent him from fighting again.

Episode 10: "Middleweight Semi-Final #1" (original airdate: 21 March 2005)
Forrest Griffin has to choose a light heavyweight fighter to come back into the house in the case he gets sent home.  He chooses Bobby Southworth, who is not given the chance to fight, as Griffin is cleared.
Kenny Florian defeated Chris Leben by TKO (doctor stoppage) at 3:11 of the second round.

Episode 11: "Middleweight Semi-Final #2" (original airdate: 28 March 2005)
Diego Sanchez defeated Josh Koscheck by split decision after 3 rounds although one judge did give all 3 rounds to Koscheck.

Episode 12: "Light Heavyweight Semi-Finals" (original airdate: 4 April 2005)
Forrest Griffin defeated Sam Hoger by TKO (strikes) at 1:05 of the second round.
Stephan Bonnar defeated Mike Swick by submission (triangle armbar) at 4:58 of the first round.

Light heavyweight bracket

Middleweight bracket

* Nate Quarry was slated to fight Florian but an injury forced him to be replaced by Leben.

Legend

The Ultimate Fighter 1 Finale

The Ultimate Fighter: Team Couture vs. Team Liddell Finale (also known as The Ultimate Fighter 1 Finale) was a mixed martial arts event held by the Ultimate Fighting Championship (UFC) on April 9, 2005. Featured were the finals from The Ultimate Fighter 1 in both the middleweight and light heavyweight divisions.

Even though the main attraction of the event was Rich Franklin vs. the UFC Hall of Famer Ken Shamrock, the spotlight was stolen by the light heavyweight finale between Forrest Griffin and Stephan Bonnar. Hailed as one of the greatest fights in MMA history by many, Forrest and Stephan produced a 3-round stand-up war that went the distance. Although Griffin took the decision, both fighters were given UFC contracts for their amazing performance.

Originally, Tito Ortiz was offered to fight Ken Shamrock in a rematch at this event. However, Ortiz left the UFC shortly after UFC 51 due to contract disputes.

Forrest Griffin vs. Stephan Bonnar fight
Even though both Forrest Griffin and Stephan Bonnar had good records at the time (Griffin 9–2, Bonnar 7–1), many were expecting this fight to be nothing more than filler before the main event between UFC legend Ken Shamrock and rising superstar Rich Franklin.

Both fighters had rough, controversial, and impressive wins to make it to the finale.  In their first fights, Forrest defeated Alex Schoenauer by TKO but suffered what appeared to be a serious cut above his eye; Stephan earned a controversial decision win over seasonal favorite Bobby Southworth.  In the semi-finals, both fighters finished their opponents with Forrest defeating teammate Sam Hoger by TKO and Stephan defeating teammate Mike Swick by Submission.

Many fans expected a standard fight between 2 contrasting fighting styles—Forrest using his striking against Stephan's jiu-jitsu. Instead, many in attendance were surprised that Stephan chose to stand and strike with Forrest.  For three rounds, they brought the crowd to their feet in raucous applause as they battled in a non-stop, knock-down, legendary battle.  To many critics and fans, this fight showed the true heart of not only UFC fighters but of all who participate and appreciate MMA.

UFC President Dana White credits this fight as being the driving force behind the future success of the UFC, often stating that due to the fight Spike TV offered them a second season of the show. An estimated three million viewers saw the Bonnar-Griffin fight live on Spike, and the resulting pay-per-view where coaches Liddell and Couture squared off saw a then-record 280,000 buys. It also kicked off what has been termed "the TUF boom", where interest in both watching MMA fights as well as training in disciplines such as Brazilian jiu-jitsu, amateur wrestling, and judo rose amongst the general public. In 2013 both Griffin and Bonnar were inducted into the UFC Hall of Fame, and whilst Griffin went on to win the UFC Light Heavyweight Championship, this fight is still considered the highlight of both fighters' careers.

Results

Coaches' Fight

UFC 52: Couture vs. Liddell 2 was held on April 16, 2005 in Paradise, Nevada.

See also
 Ultimate Fighting Championship
 List of UFC champions
 List of UFC events
 2005 in UFC

References

External links
 In Search of Strange Brew... – MMA Fighting, Chuck Mindenhall, 24 March 2015

2005 American television seasons
2005 in mixed martial arts
The Ultimate Fighter episodes
Spike (TV network) original programming